Maffei was a manufacturer of railway locomotives based in Munich, Germany. Established in 1836, it prospered for nearly a century before going bankrupt in 1930 and becoming amalgamated with the firm of Krauss to form Krauss-Maffei.  Following another seventy years of prosperity Krauss-Maffei merged with Demag and Mannesmann in 1999, the resulting conglomerate in turn being sold to Siemens AG.

Perhaps J. A. Maffei's most famous product was the S3/6 4-6-2 locomotive of 1908.

In 1836, Joseph Anton, Ritter von Maffei established the "J. A. Maffei" locomotive works in the English Garden district of Munich. The aim was to make Bavaria competitive in the machine industry. From these small beginnings a world-renowned locomotive works eventually developed.

In 1864 they delivered their 500th locomotive. Maffei, as a Munich town councillor, was praised for the building of the Hotel Bayerischer Hof. Well-known products of the locomotive works are the Bavarian S 2/6 express locomotive which held the 1907 German speed record of 154.5 km/h) and the Bavarian S 3/6. Examples of the S 3/6 are preserved in the Deutsches Museum in Munich and in the Nuremberg Transport Museum.

Maffei, amongst other things, involved itself with the building of the Augsburg Munich line and supported Johann Ulrich Himbsel in the building of the Munich - Starnberg line. Maffei, at Lake Starnberg, built their first steamer "Maximilian". By 1926 they had built 44 steam ships.

In 1930 the form of J.A.Maffei went into bankruptcy and in 1931 merged with the Krauss Company to form Krauss-Maffei. The Maffei mansion in Feldafing, by Lake Starnberg, today houses a museum and exhibitions.

Defunct manufacturing companies of Germany
Defunct locomotive manufacturers of Germany
Manufacturing companies based in Munich
Manufacturing companies established in 1836
Manufacturing companies disestablished in 1930
1836 establishments in Germany
1930 disestablishments in Germany